"P.A.S.S.I.O.N." is the lead single from the eponymous debut album by American R&B band Rythm Syndicate. Written, arranged, and produced by main vocalist Evan Rogers and guitarist/keyboardist Carl Sturken, the single was a success on the US Billboard Hot 100, peaking at number two in August 1991. Worldwide, the song reached the top 30 in Australia, Canada, and New Zealand.

Overview
The track uses a typical pop song structure and arrangement for most of each verse, but utilizes a spelling out of some words to match the cadence of the vocal; as in the end line of the second verse ("The S-E-X is just too good"). After the second verse, the chorus is repeated twice and leads into a bridge. This promptly melts into a screaming guitar solo. Nearly twenty seconds later, Rogers institutes a rap vocal, which dissipates into the chorus that repeats until the song fades out.

Personnel
 Evan Rogers: Vocals
 Carl Sturken: Guitars, keyboards
 Mike McDonald: Guitars, vocal backing
 Rob Mingrino: Saxophone (appears on "Hey, Donna")
 John "Noodle" Nevin: Bass, vocal backing
 Kevin Cloud: Drums, percussion

Production
 Written, arranged and produced by Carl Sturken and Evan Rogers
 Recorded and mixed by Darroll Gustamacho for Visual Sound Design Inc.
 Published by Warner-Tamerlane Music Corp./Could Be Music/Bayjun Beat Music

Charts

Weekly charts

Year-end charts

Release history

References

1991 singles
1991 songs
MCA Records singles
Rythm Syndicate songs
Songs written by Carl Sturken and Evan Rogers